Catopta albothoracis is a moth in the family Cossidae. It was described by Bao-Zheng Hua, Io Chou, De-Qi Fang and Shu-Liang Chen in 1990. It is found in Sichuan, China.

References

 , 2009: Catoptinae subfam. n., a new subfamily of carpenter-moths (Lepidoptera: Cossidae). Entomological Review 89 (8): 927-932.

Moths described in 1990
Catoptinae